SoundCtrl is a blog based in New York City aimed at covering developments in music and technology. The site features reviews of mobile music apps, interviews with industry professionals, and provides coverage of music tech events. SoundCtrl was founded in 2009 by Jesse Kirshbaum (CEO, NUE Agency) 

SoundCtrl also hosts regular music tech networking events, panels, and keynotes. Past panels have featured Bob Lefsetz, Nick Jonas, Asher Roth, Maura Johnston, Talib Kweli, Junior Sanchez, and Steve Stoute, among others.

FlashFWD Awards

Each year, SoundCtrl hosts the FlashFWD Awards, an annual awards show to honor individuals or organizations breaking ground in music and technology. Recently, the event has been held at New York City's Gramercy Theatre.

Past winners include:

Scott Snibbe
Spotify
BandPage
Scooter Braun
Square (application)
Soundtracking
Creators Project
SoundCloud
Troy Carter
The Echo Nest
Indaba
RockDex
Hype Machine
Big Live
Jingle Punks Music

References

American music websites